Zimna Kawa  is a settlement in the administrative district of Gmina Brusy, within Chojnice County, Pomeranian Voivodeship, in northern Poland. The settlement's Polish name translates to "Cold Coffee".

For details of the history of the region, see History of Pomerania.

References

Zimna Kawa